Viktor Nikolaevich Zemskov (30 January 1946 – 22 June 2015) was a Soviet and Russian historian, doctor (habil.) of historical sciences (2005), research associate of the Institute of Russian History of the Russian Academy of Sciences. He was a specialist on the Gulag. Zemskov revealed in detail the secret-police statistics about the Gulag, resolving many disputes among Western historians about the number of people affected by political repression in the Soviet Union.

Education and career
In 1981, Zemskov defended his candidate's (PhD) thesis "Contribution by working class to strengthening the material-technical base of agriculture in the USSR in the 1960s". In 1989, he joined the commission of the History Department of the USSR Academy of Sciences led by its corresponding member Yuri Polyakov to determine population losses and received access to statistical reports made by the OGPU-NKVD-MGB-MVD and kept in the Central State Archive of the October Revolution (CSAOR) renamed the State Archive of the Russian Federation. According to Leonid Lopatnikov, Zemskov was the only historian admitted to the archives for the reports, and later the archives were again "closed."

Between 1990 and 1992, he published the first precise statistical data on the Gulag which were based on the Gulag archives. His papers were criticized by Sergei Maksudov. In Maksudov's opinion, Lev Razgon and his followers including Aleksandr Solzhenitsyn did not envisage the total number of the camps very well and markedly exaggerated their size. At the same time, from their experience, they knew something extraordinarily important about the Archipelago, its diabolical anti-human nature. On the other hand, Zemskov, who published many documents by the NKVD and KGB, is very far from understanding of the Gulag essence and the nature of socio-political processes in the country. Without distinguishing the degree of accuracy and reliability of certain figures, without making a critical analysis of sources, without comparing new data with already known information, Zemskov absolutizes the published materials by presenting them as the ultimate truth. As a result, his attempts to make generalized statements with reference to a particular document, as a rule, do not hold water.

In response, Zemskov wrote that the charge that Zemskov allegedly did not compare new data with already known information could not be called fair. In his words, the trouble with most western writers is that they do not benefit from such comparisons. Zemskov added that when he tried not to overuse the juxtaposition of new information with "old" one, it was only because of a sense of delicacy, not to once again psychologically traumatize the researchers whose works used incorrect figures, as it turned out after the publication of the statistics by the OGPU-NKVD-MGB-MVD.

In 2005, Zemskov defended his doctoral thesis "Special settlers in the USSR. 1930–1960".

Publications 
 
 
 ГУЛАГ (историко-социологический аспект) // Социологические исследования. 1991. No. 7. С. 3–16.
 ГУЛАГ (историко-социологический аспект) // Социологические исследования. 1991. No. 6. С. 10–27.
 Демография заключенных, спецпоселенцев и ссыльных (30-е — 50-е годы) // Мир России. 1999. Т. VIII. No. 4. С. 114–124.
 К вопросу о масштабах репрессий в СССР // Социологические исследования. 1995. No. 9. С. 118–127.
 Об учете спецконтингента НКВД во всесоюзных переписях населения 1937 и 1939 гг. // Социологические исследования. 1991. No. 2. С. 74–75.
 Репатриация советских граждан и их дальнейшая судьба (1944–1956 гг.) // Социологические исследования. 1995. No. 6. С. 3–13.
 Репатриация советских граждан и их дальнейшая судьба (1944–1956 гг.) // Социологические исследования. May 1995. No. 5. С. 3–13.
 Рождение «Второй эмиграции» (1944–1952) // Социологические исследования. 1991. No. 4. С. 3–24.
 Спецпоселенцы (по документам НКВД-МВД СССР) // Социологические исследования. 1990. No. 11. С. 3–17.
 Судьба «кулацкой ссылки» в послевоенное время // Социологические исследования. 1992. No. 8. С. 18–37.
 «Кулацкая ссылка» накануне и в годы Великой отечественной войны // Социологические исследования. 1992. No. 2. С. 3–26.
 Политические репрессии в СССР (1917–1990 гг.). // Россия XXI, 1994, No. 1–2. С. 107–124.

Books 
 Спецпоселенцы в СССР, 1930–1960. — Москва: Наука, 2005. — 306 страниц, 
 Сталин и народ. Почему не было восстания. — Москва: Алгоритм, 2014. — 239 страниц, 
 Народ и война: Страницы истории советского народа накануне и в годы Великой Отечественной войны. 1938–1945. — Москва, 2014. — 288 страниц.

Video

References 

1946 births
2015 deaths
Writers from Moscow
Moscow State University alumni
20th-century Russian historians
Stalinism-era scholars and writers
Deaths from aortic aneurysm
Historians of Russia
21st-century Russian historians